Professor Bronwyn Parry is an Australian Professor who is currently the Dean of The Australian National University's College of Arts and Social Sciences; Parry took her position in early November 2022. Parry specializes in social impact work undertaken at academic institutions. Parry was previously the Vice President & Vice Principal for Service at King's College London from 2020 to 2022. She was a Professor of Global Health & Social Medicine at King's College London from 2016 to 2022. 

Parry was the first female carpenter in the Australian film and television industry, working on films such as Mad Max Beyond Thunderdome, Mad Max 2 and Dead Calm, as well as the opening of the Commonwealth Games.

Early life 
Parry was born in Queensland. She moved to Canberra in her youth to become a cabinet maker. She later went on to become Australia's first female carpenter in the film and television industry. Parry later moved to the United Kingdom to complete a PhD at The University of Cambridge in Geography.

Career 

Parry began her professional academic career at The University of Cambridge as a Junior Research Fellow from 1997 to 2000 and then as a Senior Research Fellow from 2000 to 2004.

In 2004 she began working at Queen Mary as a Reader In Cultural and Economic Geography. In 2011, through funding from The Wellcome Trust, Parry collaborated with photographer Ania Dabrowska on a book exploring memory, dementia and brain donation entitled 'Mind Over Matter'. An exhibition for 'Mind Over Matter''' was held at Shoreditch Town Hall in October 2011 combining both science and art.

Parry was then appointed at King's College London (KCL) to establish the Department of Global Health and Social Medicine in 2016 alongside Nikolas Rose. In 2016 she was made Head of the School of Global Affairs as a Professor at KCL. In early 2020, Parry established and was made director of the King's Sanctuary Programme which welcomes forced migrants into their institution and community, offer a comprehensive programme of education and research on migration, and develop an action plan to improve the lives of forced migrants in the UK. In June 2020, Parry was appointed as Vice President and Vice Principal for Service at KCL and continued to introduce and develop various social impact programmes within the institution such as accommodating Ukrainian refugees fleeing the Russo-Ukrainian War, providing them with education at KCL and accommodation.

It was announced in mid-2022 that Parry would become the dean of The Australian National University's College of Arts and Social Sciences, taking her position in early November 2022.

 Personal life 
Parry is a gay woman, who lives with her wife Sally, in Canberra. She is an advocate for LGBT rights, migrant rights and the Dignity in Dying campaign organisation.

 Selected works 

 Bioinformation (2017) Bodies across borders: The global circulation of body parts, medical tourists and professionals (2015) Mind Over Matter: Memory, Forgetting, Brain Donation and the Search for Cures for Dementia (2011) Trading the Genome: Investigating the commodification of Bio-information (2004)''

References 

Academics of King's College London
People associated with Queen Mary University of London
Australian National University people
Academic staff of the Australian National University
People associated with King's College London
Alumni of the University of Cambridge
Academics of the University of Cambridge
1960 births
Living people